Big Bell is a ghost town in Western Australia located approximately  south west of the town of Cue. The town was established in 1936, and was home to the Big Bell Gold Mine.

History

Gold was discovered in the area in 1904 by Harry Paton and a mine was quickly established. Ownership of the mine has changed a number of times through the years. Premier Gold Mining Company announced plans to develop the Big Bell Mine in 1935.

A township was established in 1936 close to the mine to provide accommodation for the mine workers. 36 blocks were sold in April 1936 and another 80 were sold in June. A population of about 850 soon inhabited the townsite and services included a number of shops, a post office and a hospital.

One of the proposed names for the town was "Townsend", with the main street to be known as "Coodardy Street".

The Big Bell Hotel was constructed and opened in 1937. It was a classic art deco style of the period and is now a ruin. The large two storey building of brick construction has brick colonnading to the north and east facades and a curved corner and once had a tiled roof.

Mining ceased in 2003 and the plant was dismantled and transported to the Westonia minesite in 2007.

It is a former railway branch terminus in Western Australia's Murchison Region. The first train arrived in Big Bell on 6 January 1937, however the line was not officially opened until 12 August that year. Services ceased from September 1944, but were revived the following year when the war in Europe was winding down and the gold mine reopened. The line finally closed on 31 December 1955.
Not much of the buildings remain, but the roads stay visible in their original position as dirt tracks. It is very visible from an aerial view.

The Big Bell hotel reputedly had the longest bar in Australia.

References

Further reading 
 O'Sullivan, Mardie.The Big Bell Hotel, 1937-1987, 1988
 Warne, L. Big Bell 1904-1954 : some historical notes of interest.  [Big Bell, W.A.] : Big Bell Historical Committee, 1954.

Mining towns in Western Australia
Ghost towns in Western Australia
Shire of Cue